Louis-Théodore Besserer (January 4, 1785 – February 3, 1861) was a businessman, notary and political figure in Lower Canada.

He was born at Château-Richer, Quebec in 1785. He studied at the Petit Séminaire de Québec and later became a notary. During the War of 1812, he was a lieutenant in the Quebec City militia, later becoming captain. He represented Quebec County in the Legislative Assembly of Lower Canada from 1833 to 1838. He supported the Ninety-Two Resolutions, but preferred working through legal channels to rebellion. So, the British government saw him as a rebel, while the Parti patriote resented his moderate stance. In 1845, he retired to a large estate that he had purchased in Bytown. He subdivided this property and sold off building lots; this area is now the Ottawa neighbourhood of Sandy Hill. Besserer Street in this area was named after him.

He died at Ottawa in 1861.

External links

References

1785 births
1861 deaths
Pre-Confederation Quebec people
Members of the Legislative Assembly of Lower Canada
People from Capitale-Nationale
Politicians from Ottawa
French Quebecers
Canadian people of German descent